The Best of Belinda, Volume 1  (released in the United States as Her Greatest Hits) is the fifth album by American singer Belinda Carlisle, released in 1992 by Virgin Records. It is Carlisle's first greatest hits compilation album and includes her hits from 1986 to 1991. It is the only Carlisle album to have topped the UK Albums Chart. The Australian and Japanese cover art differs from the International versions as does the American release.

Track listing

International version

Australian version

US version (Her Greatest Hits)

Charts

Weekly charts

Year-end charts

Certifications and sales

See also 
 List of number-one albums from the 1990s (UK)

References 

1992 greatest hits albums
Belinda Carlisle albums
Virgin Records compilation albums